Days is a 2020 Taiwanese slow cinema drama film directed by Tsai Ming-liang. It was selected to compete for the Golden Bear in the main competition section at the 70th Berlin International Film Festival. It won the jury Teddy Award at the 70th Berlinale.

Typical of many Tsai Ming-liang films, Days is minimalist, slowly paced, and features little dialogue, without subtitles. Lee Kang-sheng plays Kang, and Non is portrayed by Anong Houngheuangsy, a Laotian immigrant to Thailand in his first film role.

Plot 
Minimalist long takes of daily life show the middle-aged and middle class Kang (Lee), and the younger Non (Houngheuangsy). Kang lives alone, relaxing in his big house with a view of a goldfish pond in his backyard. Non lives in a spartan apartment. His day begins with religious worship at an altar. He then completes chores, namely the washing of vegetables. Kang travels to the city, seeking treatment for pain in his head and neck. After an acupuncture session, he schedules a massage at the parlor where Non works. Kang pays Non after the full body massage ends, and also gives him a gift, a small music box. Kang watches Non use the box, then shares a meal with him at the fast food restaurant nearby. After the meal, the two separate, and Non rests on a bench. He plays the music box again, but it can hardly be heard over the roadway noise.

Cast
 Lee Kang-sheng as Kang
 Anong Houngheuangsy as Non

Production 
Principal photography took place starting in 2014, during and after Tsai Ming-liang, Lee Kang-sheng, Claude Wang, and a cinematographer attended a theatre tour in Europe, followed by medical treatment in Hong Kong for Lee, which was also filmed. The film's opening scene was shot in Tsai's living room in Taiwan. In 2017, Tsai met Houngheuangsy and the two maintained contact via videotelephony, through which Tsai recognized Houngheuangsy's skill in cooking. Some earlier scenes featuring Lee were not used, and Tsai traveled to Bangkok to film on location, including scenes of Houngheuangsy making food. Tsai discussed with his cinematographer about ways to incorporate the captured footage into a film. The film underwent a long-term post-production in Taiwan. In May and June 2019, Tsai secured funding from the Public Television Service to complete post-production. Prior to the release of Days, Tsai Ming-liang discussed the film without naming it, stating that he was working without a concept for film in mind, adding only that it was to feature Lee Kang-sheng and another actor.

Awards and showings
Days was selected to compete for the Golden Bear in the main competition section at the 70th Berlin International Film Festival. It won the jury Teddy Award at the 70th Berlinale.

Its premiere in the United States was scheduled for April 2020, at the Museum of Modern Art. Due to the COVID-19 pandemic, that showing was cancelled. The film was shown at the 2020 New York Film Festival.

References

External links
 

2020 films
2020 drama films
2020 LGBT-related films
Taiwanese drama films
2020s Cantonese-language films
Films directed by Tsai Ming-liang
Taiwanese LGBT-related films
LGBT-related drama films
Slice of life films
Films set in Bangkok
Films shot in Bangkok
Gay-related films	
National Film Board of Canada films